The Department of Housing and Urban Development of state of Tamil Nadu is one of the Department of Government of Tamil Nadu

Sub-departments

Undertakings and bodies

Present Ministers for Housing and Urban Development 
 S.Muthuswamy-Erode West MLA

Former Ministers for Housing and Urban Development 
2006 - 2011
 Suba Thangavelan - Minister for Slum Clearance and Accommodation Control
2006 - 2011
 I. Periyasamy - Minister for Housing
2011 - 2016
 R. Vaithilingam

See also
 Government of Tamil Nadu
 Tamil Nadu Government's Departments
 Ministry of Urban Development (India)
 Ministry of Housing and Urban Poverty Alleviation (India)
 Department of Finance (Kerala)

References

External links
 Official website of the Housing and Urban Development, Tamil Nadu
 Official website of Government of Tamil Nadu

Tamil Nadu state government departments
Housing in Tamil Nadu
Urban development in India
1811 establishments in India
Tamil Nadu
Tamil Nadu